The 2009 NCAA Division III women's basketball tournament was the 28th annual tournament hosted by the NCAA to determine the national champion of Division III women's collegiate basketball in the United States.

George Fox University defeated Washington University in St. Louis in the championship game, 60–53, to claim the Bruins' first Division III national title.

The championship rounds were hosted by Hope College at the DeVos Fieldhouse in Holland, Michigan.

Bracket

Final Four

All-tournament team
 Kristen Shielee, George Fox
 Sage Indendi, George Fox
 Janice Evans, Washington University in St. Louis
 Jaimie McFarlin, Washington University in St. Louis
 Hillary Klimowicz, TCNJ

See also
 2009 NCAA Division I women's basketball tournament
 2009 NCAA Division II women's basketball tournament
 2009 NAIA Division I women's basketball tournament
 2009 NAIA Division II women's basketball tournament
 2009 NCAA Division III men's basketball tournament

References

 
NCAA Division III women's basketball tournament
2009 in sports in Michigan
George Fox Bruins
Washington University Bears